Guéreins is a commune in the Ain department in eastern France.

Population

Twin towns
Guéreins is twinned with Bottens in Switzerland.

See also
Communes of the Ain department

References

Communes of Ain
Ain communes articles needing translation from French Wikipedia